The Gulf Between Us is a 2009 novel by Geraldine Bedell. The novel is a romantic comedy set in a fictional Gulf emirate, with a word play on the region.

The book drew wide public attention when the author falsely claimed she had been uninvited from a planned appearance at the first International Festival of Literature in Dubai in 2009 because The Gulf Between Us featured a homosexual sheikh.

References

2009 British novels
Censorship in Islam
Islam-related controversies
Penguin Books books